Uroš Marović (4 July 1946 – 23 January 2014) was a Serbian water polo player notable for winning a gold medal in Mexico City in 1968, with the Yugoslavian water polo team.

See also
 Yugoslavia men's Olympic water polo team records and statistics
 List of Olympic champions in men's water polo
 List of Olympic medalists in water polo (men)
 List of men's Olympic water polo tournament top goalscorers

References
Uroš Marović's obituary

External links
 

1946 births
2014 deaths
Sportspeople from Belgrade
Serbian male water polo players
Yugoslav male water polo players
Olympic water polo players of Yugoslavia
Olympic gold medalists for Yugoslavia
Water polo players at the 1968 Summer Olympics
Water polo players at the 1972 Summer Olympics
Water polo players at the 1976 Summer Olympics
Olympic medalists in water polo
Medalists at the 1968 Summer Olympics